Graphocephala fennahi  (rhododendron leafhopper) is a species of leafhopper native to the United States. Its common name derives from it feeding on the sap of rhododendrons. The species was introduced to Great Britain in the 1930s and continental Europe in the 1970s. There has been suggestion that the rhododendron leafhopper contributes to the spread of a rhododendron fungus (Pycnostysanus azaleae) through Europe.

Description

They are small as 8-10 mm and have 4 orange stripes down their elytrons.
Their metamorphosis are incomplete, and those creatures are diurnal.
Forewing colors are ranged from red to blue. Males are 7.4-8.8 mm long, and females are 8.2-9 mm long.
They belong to the group "True bugs", very closely related to aphids and psyllids

Distribution
It a species native to the mountains of southern Virginia, the western Carolinas, and northern Georgia.

Habitats
They are recorded in grassy lands, as well as in mixed hardwood forests, usually found in rhododendron areas.

Contribution
Rhododendron leafhoppers are usually vital food for ladybugs, spiders, and some parasitic wasps.
They are afraid of Harmonia axyridis, the Harlequin Ladybird.

Seasonal occurrence
The Rhododendron leafhopper emerges from late spring and dies in November
(timeline includes: May, June, July, August, September, October and November).

Notes

Insects described in 1977
Hemiptera of North America
Cicadellini